Nikola Rakočević (born 27 June 1983, Kragujevac, Serbia) is a Serbian actor proclaimed as one of Europe’s leading young screen actors,. Rakočević has received numerous awards  at major international film festivals.
 
The Berlin Film Festival (2014) placed Nikola among its ten European Shooting Stars.

The accolade was just one among many international Best Actor awards to acknowledge the Serbian actor’s talent in feature films such as The Sky Above Us (2015), The Man Who Defended Gavrilo Princip / Branio Sam Mladu Bosnu (2014), Travelator (2013), Circles / Krugovi (2013), and Skinning / Šišanje (2010).

Rakočević has an integral role in the Sky TV/Canal+ crime series The Last Panthers (2015), an acclaimed European drama inspired by notorious Balkan jewel thieves, the Pink Panthers. He voiced Fred in the Serbian-language version of Big Hero 6 (2014).

In 2001, he began his drama study at the University of Belgrade Faculty of Dramatic Arts, from which he graduated in 2005. He lives in Belgrade with his wife and son.

Selected filmography

Awards
Shooting Stars Award (2014)

References

External links 

1983 births
Living people
Actors from Kragujevac
Serbian male film actors